Tyrone McCullagh (born 9 September 1990) is an Irish former professional boxer. As an amateur, he won bronze at the 2010 European Championships and represented Northern Ireland at the 2010 Commonwealth Games where he reached the quarter-finals.

Personal life
McCullagh was born in Derry.

Away from boxing, he works as a mental health nurse and has acknowledged the work of the NHS on his fight shorts.

An outspoken Irish nationalist, he has stated numerous times that he will not box for the British title despite being in a position to do so.

Amateur career
An amateur with Illies GG in Donegal and then Holy Family GG in Belfast, he won the Irish title in 2010 and would go on to claim bronze at the European Championships in Moscow that summer. A runner-up at National level twice more, as well as spending time in Kazakhstan as part of the Astana Arlans World Series of Boxing team.

Professional career
Turning professional having been angered by the politics of the amateur side of the sport, McCullagh made his professional debut on 25 July 2015, in Ellesmere Port, where he scored a second-round knockout (KO) of Tamas Laska.

Following 10 wins, and a move down in weight to super-bantamweight, he secured a shot at the Celtic title versus Scottish champ Joe Ham. McCullagh defeated Ham in Belfast on 30 June 2018, surviving a knockdown in the third round to otherwise dominate the Glaswegian.

McCullagh would then beat English champion Josh Kennedy on 5 October 2018 to add the WBO European title to his collection, a belt he would subsequently defend versus Spanish champion Alvaro Rodriguez.

McCullagh returned to featherweight in his next fight to enter The Golden Contract competition and he would win his quarter-final bout on 4 October 2019 at the York Hall, London, versus late replacement Razaq Najib. McCullagh was subsequently defeated by Ryan Walsh in the semi-finals at the same venue on 21 February 2020.

Professional boxing record

References

External links
 

Living people
1990 births
Irish male boxers
Boxers at the 2010 Commonwealth Games
Sportspeople from Derry (city)
Super-bantamweight boxers
Featherweight boxers
Male boxers from Northern Ireland
Commonwealth Games competitors for Northern Ireland